WECU-TV was the official (commercial) television station of East Carolina University, located in Greenville North Carolina. It was created on July 1, 1954  to help tell the story of the young college then named East Carolina Teachers College (ECTC). ECU was "made a regional university effective July 1, 1967, and assumed its present name, East Carolina University."  The station was originally housed on the Main Campus near the School of Education. It had a small studio with two TK-11 RCA broadcast cameras and four Bell and Howell field cameras and a large black and white processing/editing lab combo and a low-wattage transmission antenna located on campus.

The new offices and studio (in the area of the Brody School of Medicine) were completed in early 1972 along with formalized FCC licensing to create the nation's first university (commercial)/public television duopoly with WUNK-TV, the University of North Carolina Television PBS satellite affiliate, now 25 (PSIP) 23 (UHF). With shared staff, equipment the stations created short documentaries for UNC-TV and starting in 1974, served the needs of the new medical college. Students were allowed to work via work study program and held numerous positions at the station.

The station remained in the same location until January 1, 2010. The general manager was hired away by the nation's third largest news website in 2008 and the station manager/sales manager died from cancer in 2009. Both positions were state of North Carolina jobs, so WECU-TV was forced to close because of severely lowered tax revenues brought on by the great recession. All university stations were closed by 2014 with some being repurposed for teaching such as WNCP-TV. Central control for WUNK-TV programming is now located in the UNC-TV headquarters and the current general manager is really an antenna engineer

Milestones 
Broadcasting became full-power through the University of North Carolina Television antenna system in 1972 
Occasional color started in 1968 to work with Greenville cable company Full color started in 1975. 
Public Access channel 99 was added to the local cable company's offerings, named ECU-TV per FCC rules
24 hour programming started on January 1, 2004 
Digital transformation happened one year ahead of the other full-power TV stations on June 12, 2008

Expansion 
The station remained a service unit until the 2002 hiring of a new chancellor  and provost. The new administration immediately funded programming and added management to the station  with the internal promotion of the new General Manager, who was a veteran, media liaison of four newspaper groups to broadcast partners in two Top 50 markets and two Top 100 markets. The new station manager (#2) was hired away from Chicago's WGN. From 2002-2008 the station grew, tripling viewership and doubling revenue year over year through political advertising and by adding sports contracts. Daily broadcasting expanded into Wilmington, North Carolina, Outer Banks/Norfolk, Virginia and Raleigh, North Carolina. Nielsen certified ratings grew from 16th to 2nd largest during the same time period. Unique web page views grew from 125,000 per year to 2.38 million per month.

Programming 
Along with C-SPAN, WNCT-TV, and WCTI-TV, the newly revived station hosted the October 14, 2002 debate between North Carolina U.S. Senate candidates Erskine Bowles (D) and eventual winner Elizabeth Dole (R). Starting in 2003 new shows and documentaries were created each proceeding year. PBS programming  was scheduled from 9pm until the daily scheduled close at 11:59:59 pm. Stating in 2004 PBS programming started at 11:00 pm and ended at 5:00 am.

References 

East Carolina University
Greenville, North Carolina metropolitan area
1954 establishments in North Carolina
2010 disestablishments in North Carolina
Television stations in North Carolina